Ouamri District is a district of Médéa Province, Algeria. In 2008 the population was 25,909. 

The district is further divided into 3 municipalities:
Ouamri
Oued Harbil
Hannacha

Districts of Médéa Province